Little People is a toy brand for children ages 6–36 months and to ages 3 and up, originally produced by Fisher-Price, Inc. in the 1960s as the Play Family People. The current product line consists of playsets, mini-sets and accessories, books, CDs, and DVDs focusing on various configurations of 5 characters named Eddie, Tessa, Mia, Koby, and Sofie. Mattel reports that since the brand's launch, over 2-billion Little People figures have been sold in over 60 countries. In 2016, Little People was inducted into the National Toy Hall of Fame.

The "Little People" name, registered and trademarked by Mattel and Fisher-Price in 1985, came from Mattel following the lead of consumers who referred to the early Play Family playsets as "those little people".

By 2019, more than two billion Little People figures had been sold in more than 60 countries.

History

Original Little People

Little People started in 1950 with the "Looky Fire Truck" and three round-headed fire men (attached permanently to the toy). Following the success of this toy, Between 1952 and 1953, Fisher-Price developed the "Super-Jet" and "Racing Rowboat".

Another early Little People precursor, the #959 "Safety School Bus", was introduced in 1959. The set included a school bus together with six independent figures made out of tall slimmer pegs of cardboard tubes wrapped in lithographs simulating clothes. The toy gained instant popularity and other sets soon came out.

Little People Play Family
In 1960, Fisher-Price introduced two additional toys with removable figures; "Snorky the Fire Engine" and the "Nifty Station Wagon." The Nifty Station Wagon came with two adult figures and one child figure, thus the first "Play Family" was born. In 1985, Fisher-Price trademarked "Little People" and formally changed the name of the brand. Today, Little People are known and sold throughout the world. A Nifty Station Wagon in mint condition, in the box, could command up to $1,000,000 among toy collectors.

Body style variations
The original Little People went through six major styles of body (base) configurations, and even within each major classification there may be one or more minor style variations. By 1961, the figures were produced with wood; plastic was used for their vehicles and buildings. A few years later, the typical smiley face of the traditional Little People introduced in a "straight-body" format. All of the people had a basic cylinder body with the female figures only identifiable by the addition of slanted, oval eyes and eyelashes. By 1965, the Little People consisted of a small cylindrical base and a wider cylinder shape for boys and men and a conical upper shape for the girls. Adult women had a kind of hourglass-shaped upper body. The bottom portions of the bodies were indented slightly (allowing for placement in the corresponding holes in other furniture, cars and other vehicles, in which the figures were able to "sit").

Little People playsets
In 1968, Fisher-Price introduced the first Little People playset, the famous Play Family Barn with barn doors that made a "moo" sound when opened. Also at this time, the figures were made with plastic bodies instead of wood. The Play Family dollhouse was introduced in 1969, with other playsets to follow, including a firehouse, an airport and a service station. Eventually, the toys encompassed a wide range of playsets, furniture packs, and accessory packs.

In the mid-1970s, Fisher-Price produced the Sesame Street town, with different Sesame Street stores, a bridge with stop lights and Sesame Street characters such as Bert, Ernie, and the first Little People toys modeled after non-celebrities: Loretta Long (Susan), Roscoe Orman (Gordon), and Will Lee (Mr. Hooper). Soon after, the Little People Discovery Airport, a hospital, and a school would also be released. Little People characters had by then been also produced with plastic products exclusively.

During the late 2010s, a line of celebrity Little People was launched with playsets including Kiss Little People and The Beatles "Yellow Submarine" Little People.

Chunky Little People
In 1988, Marvel Productions made an animated series of six Little People videos such as Favorite Songs, 3 Favorite Stories, A Visit to the Farm, Fun With Words, Jokes, Riddles and Rhymes, and Christmas Fun, which were released by New World Video, which the deal was signed in August 1987. This video series centered around two children named Timmy and Penny and their Baby Sister, their parents, Cousin Marvin and their dog Lucky. In 1991, the Original Little People figures were redesigned for children. They were made "chunkier", were more bright and colorful, and were designed so that they could activate motion within the play sets. Most people believe that these figures were developed as a replacement for the original Little People due to the increasing concerns and pressures from parents and consumer-advocacy groups for safer toy designs. After Fisher-Price was bought by Mattel in the 1990s, Little People reappeared on the markets, their figure significantly larger in size from the original Little People characters due to revised toy safety guidelines. These figures are called "chunky" by collectors.

Articulated Little People
In 1997, the figures underwent a drastic redesign, from simple lathe-turned shapes to sculpted bodies. Little People became much more detailed and smaller in overall size – in fact, closer in size to the original Little People. For the first time, the Little People figures had arms, hands, more detailed clothing, molded hair, and facial features.

In 1999, Little People celebrated their 40th anniversary with the return of the first Little People toy ever: Little People School Bus and characters. The play sets include the school bus, circus train, construction vehicles, and other play sets.

In 2000, the Little People line introduced electronic sounds and movements. The Little People characters were given distinct personalities and voices in a stop motion, animated series with Phil Craig, known for starring in The Time Traveller's Wife, Cinderella Man, and Spider; and Aaron Neville singing the theme song. The series was produced by Denmark-based Egmont Imagination and Cuppa Coffee Studios between 1999 and 2005.

Characters
 Eddie (voiced by Susan Roman) is a boy who is Sarah Lynn's twin brother. He has blond hair. He wears a red-and-white striped shirt and blue jeans. He has a pet frog named Freddie.
 Michael (voiced by Julie Lemieux) is an African-American boy with black hair. He wears a turquoise sweater, blue jeans, and a red baseball cap. 
 Sarah Lynn (voiced by Susan Roman) is a girl who is Eddie's twin sister. She has blonde hair. She wears a white dress with a blue top and a red flower on it.
 Maggie (voiced by Karen Bernstein) is a girl with curly light brown hair. She wears a yellow/aquamarine dress with a matching hairbow and red glasses. 
 Sonya Lee (voiced by Caroly Larson) is an Asian-American girl with apricot skin and dark hair. She wears a white shirt with a pink overall dress and a pink headband. According to her version of the theme song, Sonya Lee is very gentle, true, and kind to people and animals.

Episodes and videos
Since 1999, 138 individual episodes and six music videos have been produced for the Little People franchise. They have been collected into around 30 volumes and released for home media on VHS and over 15 DVDs with some being distributed by Artisan Entertainment and Lionsgate Home Entertainment through Family Home Entertainment.

Little People A to Z Learning Zoo
In 2007, Fisher-Price produced the Little People A to Z learning zoo. This production introduced animals to the Little People family. The A to Z learning zoo includes 26 animals that each begin with a different letter of the alphabet. This interactive play mat allows children to learn the alphabet, recognize letters, and learn facts about animals. This was a significant step for the company, as education is now infused in their product.

Television series

Little People sets based on popular culture 

 WWE Ultimate Warrior and "Macho Man" Randy Savage (2019)
 The Beatles Yellow Submarine (2019)
 The Office (2020)
 Masters of the Universe (2020)
 The Lord of the Rings (2020)
 Elf (2020) 
 Golden Girls 
 The Rolling Stones 
 Ted Lasso (2022)
 RuPaul (2022)
 Buffalo Bills (2022)
 Avatar: The Last Airbender (2022)
 E.T. The Extra-Terrestrial (2022)

Choking risk with the original Little People 
The thumb-sized shape of the original Little People figurines could become lodged in the throat of young children and prevent the flow of oxygen. There have been seven children who died and one that was seriously injured after choking on the figurines. In one case, the company paid a $2.5 million settlement to the parents of Iain Cunningham after their son became physically and mentally disabled from choking on a figurine. At the time, the judgment was considered the largest liability settlement in the American toy industry. 

In 1990, New York Attorney General Robert Abrams negotiated a settlement with Fisher-Price in which the company agreed to post a more specific choking hazard warning label on the boxes of Little People toys.

A book published in 1986 by Edward Swartz titled Toys That Kill prominently featured three original Little People figures on the cover and featured the Iain Cunningham case. The American Museum Of Tort Law features an exhibit on the Little People choking hazard.

While the product was redesigned in 1991 to become chunkier and therefore harder to for children to swallow, Fisher-Price contended that the redesign was not in response to choking deaths and that the Little People figurine are safe when they are played with by children of the appropriate age. In response to the choking deaths, the company launched the "Family Alert Program" campaign in 1992 to warned parents not to let young children play with Little People playset and other toys that are designed for older children. A Fisher-Price spokesman stated that "the original Little People were designed for children 2 to 6 and met all the safety standards for Fisher-Price, and we've never had a complaint from parents of children in that age range."

In 2010, Health Canada issued a warning that pre-1991 Little People toys should be disposed after a recent choking death of an infant.

In popular culture
The Robot Chicken episode "Midnight Snack" aired a sketch with Little People by using stop motion animation and dubbed voices. However, they are not the current Little People characters.

The indie rock band Sunny Day Real Estate's debut album Diary features Little People on the album cover.

Sources
 This Old Toy's Original "Little People History"
 Behold the Little People - The Life and Death of America's Favorite Play Family by Mark Simple, in X magazine #7, July 1992
 History of Mattel
 
 Fisher-Price Little People at Retroland

References

External links
 Interview with Bob Jourdian, Director of Product Development at Fisher-Price about the history and evolution of the Little People.

Mattel franchises
Fisher-Price
Direct-to-video film series
1950s toys
1960s toys
1970s toys
Products introduced in 1959
Products introduced in 1960
Marvel Productions films